Tyler Hughes (born November 5, 1980) is a Canadian former soccer  player who played for Victoria Highlanders in the USL Premier Development League.

Career

College
Hughes had a standout career at Coastal Carolina University that saw him earn four All-Conference and two All-South selections.

Professional
Hughes made his professional debut with the Wilmington Hammerheads of the USL Second Division in 2002. In 2003, he signed for the Toronto Lynx, where he earn a starting position and finished sixth on the club in minutes played in his debut season. He played for the Lynx again in 2004 playing 22 games but failed to reach the playoffs for the second straight year.

In 2005 Hughes was signed by Swedish side Östers IF, and in his first season he played ten games, in 2006 he played six games and scored two goals.

After his release from Östers IF Hughes returned to Canada; after playing in amateur leagues in his native British Columbia for a couple of years, he trialled with USSF Division 2 Pro League side Austin Aztex, before signing with the Victoria Highlanders of the USL Premier Development League in 2010.

References

External links
Victoria Highlanders profile
Östers Tyler Hughes profile

1980 births
Living people
Canadian expatriate sportspeople in the United States
Canadian expatriate soccer players
Canadian expatriate sportspeople in Sweden
Canadian soccer players
Canadian people of Welsh descent
Expatriate footballers in Sweden
Expatriate soccer players in the United States
Association football defenders
Östers IF players
Soccer players from Victoria, British Columbia
Superettan players
Toronto Lynx players
USL First Division players
Victoria Highlanders players
USL League Two players
Canada men's youth international soccer players
Canada men's under-23 international soccer players
Coastal Carolina Chanticleers men's soccer players